The Special Purpose Police Unit ( (XTPD); , OMON) or OPON (Otryad Politsii Osobogo Naznacheniya) was a special forces detachment unit within the Ministry of Internal Affairs of Azerbaijan in the early 1990s formed during the first Nagorno-Karabakh War. The first body of the unit consisted of 3,000 policemen.

The initial name of OMON was changed to OPON after the Azerbaijani  Declaration of Independence. The unit was dissolved by the government after an OPON revolt led by Colonel Rovshan Javadov on March 13, 1995. On March 17, 1995, security forces of Azerbaijan sieged and stormed the OPON headquarters in the outskirts of Baku where Javadov, along with over 50 others, was killed.

See also
Rapid Police Unit
Azerbaijani Armed Forces
Internal Troops of Azerbaijan

References

Police of Azerbaijan
Military of Azerbaijan
Military police
1990 establishments in Azerbaijan
Military units and formations of Azerbaijan
Military units and formations established in 1995
Gendarmerie